Worsley Icefalls is an icefalls near the head of Nimrod Glacier. Seen by the northern party of the New Zealand Geological Survey Antarctic Expedition (NZGSAE) (1961–62) and presumably named for Frank Worsley, member of the British Trans-Antarctic Expedition, 1914–16, and Shackleton-Rowett Antarctic Expedition, 1921–22.

Icefalls of Oates Land